Escárcega is a small city in the Mexican state of Campeche, 
As of 2010, the city of Escárcega had a population of 29,477.

The city serves as the administrative centre for the surrounding municipality of the same name, which includes the city and its hinterland. In 2010 the population of Escárcega municipality was 54,184. Its area is 4,569.64 km² (1,764.35 sq mi), which includes many smaller outlying communities, the largest of which is called División del Norte.

Escárcega is at the junction of Mexican Federal Highways 251 and 186, and is crossed by the railway that runs from Coatzacoalcos, Veracruz, to Campeche, Campeche. It is a new city that grew up in the 20th century with the arrival of the railways and roads. It is named after Francisco Escárcega, a native of Tlaxcala who fought in the Mexican Revolution and oversaw the construction of much of the rail network in the country's southeast.

Telesecundaria 80

Climate

References
Link to tables of population data from Census of 2005 INEGI: Instituto Nacional de Estadística, Geografía e Informática
Campeche Enciclopedia de los Municipios de México

Populated places in Campeche
Municipality seats in Campeche